Anton Carl Diderik Dahlberg (born 10 May 1985) is a Swedish sailor, who specialized in two-person dinghy (470) class. He has represented Sweden, along with his partner Sebastian Östling, in two editions of the Olympic Games (2008 and 2012) and with Fredrik Bergström in 2016 and 2020, winning an Olympic silver in 2020. He has also been training for the Royal Swedish Yacht Club throughout most of his sporting career under his personal coach and mentor Per Frykholm. As of September 2013, Dahlberg was ranked no. 28 in the world in the two-person dinghy class by the International Sailing Federation.

Dahlberg made his official debut at the 2008 Summer Olympics in Beijing, where he paired up with crew member Sebastian Östling in the men's 470 class. The Swedish duo finished fifteenth in a ten-round opening series with a net score of 111, trailing Israelis Gideon Kliger and Udi Gal by a narrow, three-point gap in the final standings.

Dahlberg qualified to compete for the second time as a skipper in the men's 470 class at the Olympics by finishing eleventh and receiving at the ISAF World Championships in Perth, Western Australia. Teaming again with Ostling in the opening series, the Swedish duo achieved four top 10 finishes to guarantee a spot in the final race, but fell short for the podium with an accumulated net score of 123 points and a tenth-place finish in a fleet of twenty-seven boats.

Achievements

References

External links
 
 
 
  
 

1985 births
Living people
Swedish male sailors (sport)
People from Växjö
Royal Swedish Yacht Club sailors
Olympic sailors of Sweden
Sailors at the 2008 Summer Olympics – 470
Sailors at the 2012 Summer Olympics – 470
Sailors at the 2016 Summer Olympics – 470
Sailors at the 2020 Summer Olympics – 470
Medalists at the 2020 Summer Olympics
Olympic medalists in sailing
Olympic silver medalists for Sweden
Sportspeople from Kronoberg County